JTBC Drama Festa is a one-act play TV series that airs on JTBC,  a South Korean subscription television network.

List of dramas

See also
 Drama Special
 Drama Stage

Notes

References

JTBC television dramas
Korean-language television shows
2017 South Korean television series debuts
2020s South Korean television series